The Tour Saint-Jacques ('Saint James's Tower') is a monument located in the 4th arrondissement of Paris, France, at the intersection of Rue de Rivoli with Rue Nicolas Flamel. This  Flamboyant Gothic tower is all that remains of the former 16th-century Church of Saint-Jacques-de-la-Boucherie ("Saint James of the butchers"), which was demolished in 1797, during the French Revolution, leaving only the tower.

What remains of the destroyed church of Saint-Jacques-de-la-Boucherie is now considered a national historic landmark.

History

The Way of St. James
The tower's rich decoration reflects the wealth of its patrons, the wholesale butchers of the nearby Les Halles market. The masons in charge were Jean de Felin, Julien Ménart and Jean de Revier. It was built in 1509 to 1523, during the reign of King Francis I. With a dedication to Saint James the Greater, the ancient church and its landmark tower welcomed pilgrims setting out on the road that led to Tours and headed for the Way of St James, which led to the major pilgrimage destination of Santiago de Compostela. A relic of the saint preserved in the church linked it the more strongly and in modern times occasioned its listing in 1998 as a World Heritage Site by UNESCO among the sites and structures marking the chemins de Compostelle, the pilgrimage routes in France that led like tributaries of a great stream headed towards Santiago in the northwest of Spain.

Nineteenth century

The church, with the exception of the  tower, was demolished in 1793; preservation of the tower was a condition of the contract by which the church was bought for the value of its building materials. In 1824 it was being used as a shot tower to make small shot. It was repurchased by the City of Paris in 1836 and declared a Monument Historique in 1862. A statue of the saint was installed on the top of the tower during the 19th century.

During the Second Empire, the architect Théodore Ballu restored the tower, placing it on a pedestal and designing a small city park around it.  This coincided with the construction of the rue de Rivoli and the avenue Victoria nearby, requiring huge quantities of earth to be removed to ensure the rue de Rivoli a smooth flat path.  The pedestal allowed the tower to retain its original elevation: nowadays, the change in ground level can best be appreciated in rue St-Bon, just northeast of the tower, where a staircase leads up to the original street level at rue de la Verrerie.

A statue of Blaise Pascal is located at the base of the tower, commemorating the experiments on atmospheric pressure, though it is debated whether they were performed here or at the church of Saint-Jacques-du-Haut-Pas. A meteorological laboratory is also installed at the top of the tower.

The tower inspired Alexandre Dumas to write the play La tour Saint-Jacques-de-la-boucherie in 1856.

Nicolas Flamel, reputedly an alchemist and a patron of the church, was buried under its floor.

Modern restoration
The tower was surrounded by scaffolding and obscured by sheeting for some years as surveyors investigated the condition of the stone. Recent findings show that most of the stone and its ornamentation originates from the late-medieval era of the tower's construction, and was not added by the 19th-century restorers.  Unfortunately, the survey also indicates serious cracking. The top three quarters of sheeting were taken down in March 2008, revealing a renovated upper section of the tower. From October 2008 to February 2009, the scaffolds and sheeting were completely removed and the surrounding park's landscaping was being restored. Finally, on 18 April 2009, the park was re-opened to the public.

Gallery

See also
 Fontaine du Palmier
 Place du Chatelet

References

External links 
 

1525 establishments in France
16th-century Roman Catholic church buildings in France
Monuments and memorials in Paris
Monuments historiques of Paris
Roman Catholic churches completed in 1523
Roman Catholic churches in the 4th arrondissement of Paris
Towers completed in the 16th century
Towers in Paris
World Heritage Sites in France
Gothic architecture in Paris